Faiza Hasan is a Pakistani actress and producer. She is known for her roles in dramas Manzil, Izn-e-Rukhsat, Amma Aur Gulnaz and Humnasheen. She is best known for her role in drama serial Nand as Gohar.

Early life
Faiza was born in 1982 on 5th January in Karachi, Pakistan. She completed her studies from Khatoon-e-Pakistan Government Degree College For Women, she did B.A in English literature and later she did masters in masters degree in both English and Urdu literature.

Career
In 2003, Faiza appeared in drama Sahil Ki Tamana on PTV. After that she appeared in dramas on PTV and noted for her roles in Tootay Khwab, Mah E Neem Shab, 86 Lekin and Darbar-e-Dil, Wajood-E-Lariab. She also appeared in dramas Amma Aur Gulnaz, Humnasheen and Izn-e-Rukhsat. She also appeared in telefilms. In 2018 she appeared in movie Load Wedding as Farhana. In 2020 she appeared in drama Nand as Gohar.

Personal life
Faiza is married to Mubasher Hamayoun, they both married in 2007. She has two children - a son named Mohammad Suleman and a daughter named Jahan Ara.

Filmography

Television

Telefilm

Film

Awards and nominations

References

External links
 
 
 

1982 births
Living people
Pakistani television actresses
21st-century Pakistani actresses
Pakistani film actresses